Rothbart or Rotbart is a surname, and may refer to:
Mel Rothbart
Former CCNY basketball player who was given the original moniker “Point Guard”
 Michael Forster Rothbart, American photojournalist
 Davy Rothbart, American filmmaker
 Robert Rothbart, Bosnian-Israeli-Serbian professional basketball player playing center for Ironi Nahariya in Israel
 von Rothbart, the evil sorcerer and a fictional character in the ballet Swan Lake